Xianju South railway station is a railway station in Xianju County, Taizhou, Zhejiang, China. It is an intermediate stop on the Jinhua–Taizhou railway. The station opened on 11 August 2021.

It has two platforms and two through lines.

See also
Xianju railway station

References 

Railway stations in Zhejiang
Railway stations in China opened in 2021